The 1989 Little League World Series took place between August 22 and August 26 in Williamsport, Pennsylvania. The National Little League of Trumbull, Connecticut, defeated the Kang-Tu Little League of Kaohsiung, Taiwan, in the championship game of the 43rd Little League World Series.

Teams

Championship bracket

Position bracket

Notable players
Kevin Cash (Tampa, Florida) – MLB catcher between 2002 and 2010, and MLB coach and manager
Chris Drury (Trumbull, Connecticut) – NHL center from 1998 to 2011; inducted to the Little League Hall of Excellence in 2009.

Champions path
The Trumbull National LL went 12–1 to reach the LLWS.
In total, their record was 15–1.

References

Further reading

External links

Little League World Series
Little League World Series
Little League World Series
Little League World Series